The 2005 NATO Headquarters summit was a NATO summit held in the NATO Headquarters, Brussels, Belgium on 22 February 2005. During this summit, NATO leaders reaffirmed their support for building stability in the Balkans, Afghanistan and Iraq, and commit to strengthening the partnership between NATO and the European Union.

2005 NATO Headquarters summit
2005 in Belgium
2005 in politics
Diplomatic conferences in Belgium
21st-century diplomatic conferences (NATO)
2005 in international relations
2005 conferences
2000s in Brussels
Belgium and NATO
February 2005 events in Europe